The FIA CODASUR Rally Championship is an international rally championship which is run by Confederacion Deportiva Automovilismo Sudamericana (CODASUR) under the auspices of the FIA and held across South America, although some events in the northernmost reaches of South America compete in the NACAM Rally Championship zone rather than Codasur.

Competing rallies have generally had short and intermittent histories within the championship, although Brazil's Rally de Erechim and Uruguay's Rally del Atlantico have been in almost every championship. Host nations have kept relatively constant; Brazil and Paraguay have hosted events in every championship, Bolivia and Uruguay all bar one and Argentina has only missed two years. Chile and Peru, former regulars have not hosted events since 2009 and 2010 respectively.

Paraguayan Gustavo Saba is the most successful in Codasur history with three consecutive titles from 2011 to 2013 and another three from 2016 to 2018. Argentine drivers Roberto Sanchez and Raúl Martínez have each won the championship twice as has Paraguayan driver Diego Domínguez. The championship had been dominated by drivers in Group N Mitsubishis and Subarus until R5 became more widely used, with Škoda Fabia and Ford Fiesta R5 cars now holding the most wins. The region has a strong history in Group N with Uruguayan Gustavo Trelles and Argentinian Gabriel Pozzo both winning the Production World Rally Championship forerunner about the time of the creation of the Codasur championship.

The 2019 championship took in events held in Argentina, Paraguay, Brazil, Bolivia and Uruguay. The 2020 and 2021 championships were cancelled as a consequence of the COVID-19 pandemic.

List of events
Sourced from:
Rally de Ca'aguazú, Paraguay (2004)
Rally de Erechim, Brazil (2004, 2006–present)
Rally Cochabamba, Bolivia (2004, 2008)
Rally La Pampa, Argentina (2004)
Rally Santiago, Chile (2004–06, 2008)
Rally del Atlántico, Uruguay (2004–present)
Rally Rio Ceballos, Argentina (2005–07)
Rally Villarica, Paraguay (2005)
Rally de Santa Cruz, Bolivia (2005–07, 2010, 2012–present)
Rally Bento Gonçalves, Brazil (2005)
Rally Huancayo, Peru (2005–10)
Rally Concepcion, Argentina (2005–07)
Rally de Encarnación, Paraguay (2006–09)
Rally Rio Negro, Chile (2006)
Rally de Ouro Branco, Brazil (2007)
Rally Cordillera, Paraguay (2008)
Rally de Curitiba, Brazil (2009–10)
Rally San Luis, Argentina (2009)
Rally Sucre, Bolivia (2009)
Rally Pucon, Chile (2009)
Rally Argentina (2010, 2015–2018)
Rally Trans Itapua, Paraguay (2010–present)
Rally de la Yerba Mate, Argentina (2011)
Rally de Misiones Posadas, Argentina (2012)
Rally de la Tierra Colorada, Argentina (2019)

Champions

References

External links
 FIA Codasur
 Rally FIA Codasur

 
FIA Zone rally championships
Motorsport in South America